Penstemon thurberi is a species of penstemon known by the common names Thurber's beardtongue and Thurber's penstemon. It is native to the southwestern United States and northern Mexico, where it grows in many types of desert and mountain habitat, including sandy flats, chaparral, scrub, and woodlands. It is a shrub growing erect and somewhat rounded in form, reaching around 80 centimeters in maximum height. Many slender stems emerge from its woody base. The leaves are narrow, linear in shape, with edges rolled upward nearly into a tube. The long inflorescence bears funnel-shaped lavender, pink, or pale blue-purple flowers up to 1.5 centimeters in length.

External links
Jepson Manual Treatment
Photo gallery

thurberi
Flora of the Southwestern United States
Flora of Mexico